A Prospect of Derby is a 1725 painting by an unknown artist that shows the layout of Derby in the early 18th century.

Description
On the left is a house called Castlefield that was home to the Borrow family. There are paintings of Isaac, Thomas, and Ann Borrow in Derby Museum and Art Gallery. Left of centre is Exeter House which is no longer standing but came to notability when it played host to Bonnie Prince Charlie when he decided to turn back with his Scottish armies and not go to London to take the crown. The large buildings to the right are mills powered by the River Derwent. Although one of the buildings is now demolished the right hand mill is now part of a World Heritage Site and was Derby Industrial Museum.

The painting is displayed (in 2011) in Derby Museum in the room reserved for the Hanson Log Boat.

Provenance
The painting was bought by Derby Museum and Art Gallery in 2006 from a European collector via Sotheby's.

References

1725 paintings
Collections of Derby Museum and Art Gallery
Derby Museum and Art Gallery
Works of unknown authorship